Colias erschoffi   is a butterfly in the family Pieridae. It is found in Tien-Shan.

Description
Colias erschoffi is a pretty yellow species, in which also the male bears a complete row of submarginal spots, the sexes therefore being very similar; the hindwing is greenish yellow, with sharply defined yellow submarginal band and a large reddish yellow middle spot which has a light centre and is distally produced into a point.

Biology

References

External links
von Fuchs

Butterflies described in 1881
erschoffi
Butterflies of Asia